Stumbaugh Post No. 180 GAR Hall, also known as Austin Community Hall, was a historic Grand Army of the Republic hall located at Austin, Cass County, Missouri. It was built in 1893, and is a one-story, T-shaped frame building. It has a gable roof and displays little ornamentation, typical of rural vernacular buildings. From 1892 to 1911 the building served the local chapter of the Grand Army of the Republic (G.A.R.) as the veterans meeting hall. It was used as a community center until 1996.

It was listed on the National Register of Historic Places in 2000. The clubhouse was razed in 2007.

References

Missouri
Clubhouses on the National Register of Historic Places in Missouri
Buildings and structures completed in 1892
Buildings and structures in Cass County, Missouri
National Register of Historic Places in Cass County, Missouri
1892 establishments in Missouri